Lempy Lucas, also: Lukas, (born 7 November 1961 in Eendombe, Omusati Region) is a Namibian politician. A member of the National Assembly from 2000 until 2015, Lucas is a member of the South West Africa People's Organization (SWAPO). She has held a number of Deputy Minister positions in Namibia's government, she currently is Deputy Minister of Agriculture, Water and Forestry. She had previously been a SWAPO Party Youth League activist.

Career
Lucas joined SWAPO in 1979 and fled shortly thereafter to Angola, where she studied. In 1982, she earned a diploma in Youth Administration from East Germany. She then returned to Angola in the mid-1980s, where she worked as an administrator at the SWAPO Health and Education Centre at Kwanza-Sul. In 1986 she was reassigned to Luanda, where she worked in the SWAPO headquarters until independence in 1989. From 1990 to 2002, Lucas served as an important figure in the SWAPO Party Youth League. In 1997, she joined the SWAPO Central Committee. In 2004, she was appointed to the position of Deputy Foreign Minister. She was then a resident of Ohangwena Region.

Following the 2009 parliamentary elections, Lucas was redeployed as Deputy Minister of Defence. In the Cabinet reshuffle following the fifth SWAPO congress in 2012, Lucas swapped positions with Petrus Iilonga and is now the Deputy Minister of Agriculture, Water and Forestry. In the 2014 parliamentary elections, Lucas did not gain a seat in parliament. Her portfolio of Deputy minister of Agriculture, Water and Forestry was split and taken over by Theo Diergaardt and Anna Shiweda.

References

1961 births
Living people
People from Omusati Region
People from Ohangwena Region
Members of the National Assembly (Namibia)
SWAPO politicians
Government ministers of Namibia
20th-century Namibian women politicians
20th-century Namibian politicians
21st-century Namibian women politicians
21st-century Namibian politicians
Women government ministers of Namibia
Namibian exiles
Namibian expatriates in Angola
Namibian expatriates in East Germany
Women members of the National Assembly (Namibia)